Beach Blvd is a seminal compilation album featuring early Californian punk rock bands.

Overview
An influential sampler LP, Beach Blvd helped to usher in the hardcore punk movement in suburban Southern California, aided by DJ Rodney Bingenheimer, who gave the record its first airplay on his weekly radio show.

Conceived by the controversial Robbie "Posh Boy" Fields, the album gathers three acts with quite different musical styles: the Crowd from Huntington Beach, Rik L Rik from West Covina, and the Simpletones from Rosemead.

The record title advertised the music's suburban origins: California State Route 39, named Beach Boulevard in the stretch that crosses Orange County, ran inland from the Crowd's hometown to Rik L Rik's.

Production
Produced by Fields, all songs on Beach Blvd were recorded and mixed between November 1978 and July 1979 at Media Art Studio in Hermosa Beach, California.

The tracks credited to Rik L Rik, are remixes of five demo songs recorded in November 1978 by the third lineup of San Francisco punk rock band Negative Trend, where he was lead singer. These versions feature bass overdubs by Jay Lansford, who also added a new guitar track on "Atomic Lawn".

Beach Blvd was mastered by Lanky Linstrot at Wally Heider's Mobile Recording Truck, based in Hollywood, California.

Release
Only three songs featured on Beach Blvd were previously released: Simpletones' "California" was the lead tune on their eponymous 7-inch single record from early 1979; while "Meat House" and "I Got Power" were issued as a Rik L Rik 7-inch single in mid-1979.

Accompanied by liner notes provided by Bingenheimer, Beach Blvd was originally released in the summer of 1979 on Posh Boy Records, in 12-inch LP format. The album was also the Crowd's recorded debut.

Reissues
In 1981, Posh Boy Records issued a rare edition of Beach Blvd on cassette tape, which included, as bonus tracks, the entire Red Cross EP by Redd Kross from Hawthorne, California.

The original release on 12-inch vinyl disc was repressed in 1986.

In 1990, Posh Boy issued a 29-track extended version on CD featuring liner notes by Fields and Tony Cadena. Bonus tracks included almost half of Like It or Not Live!, the only album by Rik L Rik's first band, the short-lived West Covina four-piece F-Word!, recorded live at San Francisco's Mabuhay Gardens in the spring of 1978 and released posthumously that same year. The 1990 CD edition also added six more Simpletones songs: "I Like Drugs", the B-side of the single "California" from 1979; "TV Love" from Rodney on the ROQ, the first of Bingenheimer's compilations, originally issued in 1980; "Disco Ape" (aka "You Drive Me (Disco) Ape"), an unreleased Lansford arrangement of the Dickies' "You Drive Me Ape (You Big Gorilla)" from 1978; and tracks 13, 15 and 17, all released for the first time. The 1990 edition closed with three additional cuts by the Crowd: "Right Time", also taken from Rodney on the ROQ, "Desmond and Kathy", and an instrumental rendition of the Archies' "Melody Hill" from 1969, both taken from band's first studio album, A World Apart from 1981.

In 1991, the original compilation was included in Richard Elerick's numbered 3-LP box set History of Rik L Rik, in conjunction with F-Word!'s album Like It or Not Live! and Rik L Rik's The Lost Album from 1991.

In 2004, under license from Posh Boy, the Italian label Get Back re-released the 1979 12-inch LP.

The following year, Get Back released a 24-song Digipak CD edition, an abridged version of the 1990 edition.

Track listings

1979 LP release

1981 MC edition

1990 CD edition

2005 Digipak CD edition

Personnel

Simpletones
Richard W. Scott (aka Snickers) – vocals (tracks A1 to A3, B6), backing vocals (B7)
Jay Lansford – guitar
Danny Ruiz – bass
Ken "Rabbit" Bragger (credited as Rabit) – drums
Kendall Behnke – vocals (B7)
Jerry Koskie – backing vocals (B7)
Simpletones (1990 CD edition)
Snickers – vocals (13, 14, 16)
Kendall – vocals (13)
Jerry – vocals (12, 13, 15, 17)
Rik L Rik
Richard Elerick (best known as Rik L Rik) – vocals
Craig Gray – guitar (A4, A5, B3, B4)
Jay Lansford – bass, guitar (B5)
Tim Mooney – drums
The Crowd
Jim "Trash" Decker – vocals
James Kaa (credited as Jim K) – lead guitar
Tracy Porterfield – guitar
Jay Decker – bass
Barry "Cuda" Miranda – drums
Dennis Walsh – drums (28 to 30 on the 1990 CD edition)
Red Cross (1981 MC edition)
Jeff McDonald – vocals
Greg Hetson – guitar
Steve McDonald – bass
Ron Reyes – drums
F-Word! (1990 CD edition)
Rik L Rik (credited as Rick L Rick) – vocals
Kenny Sercu (aka Dim Wanker) – guitar
Steve Effete (aka Steve Offut) – bass
David "Dutch" Schultz – drums
Dirk Dirksen – emcee (1)

Production
Robbie Fields – production (A4, A5, B3 to B5, B7), co-production (A1 to A3, A6 to B2, B6)
Jay Lansford – co-production (A1 to A3, B6)
The Crowd – co-production (A6 to B2)
Rolf Erickson – engineering
David Tarling – engineering
Glen Lockett (best known as Spot) – engineering
Lanky Linstrot – mastering
Ginger Canzoneri – graphic design
Kristina Birrer – photography
Rodney Bingenheimer – liner notes
Additional production (1981 MC edition)
Roger Harris – production, engineering (B6 to B11)
Additional production (1990 CD edition)
Robbie Fields – production (1 to 6, 12), co-production (14 to 17, 28 to 30)
Michael Corby – production (13)
Jay Lansford – co-production (14 to 17), arrangement (16)
The Crowd – co-production (28 to 30)
Chip Brown – engineering (1 to 6)
Uvex Reed – engineering (1 to 6)
David Hines – engineering, mixing (28 to 30)
Robert Vosgien – mastering
Christian Witt – graphic design
Tony Cadena (credited as Tony Montana) – liner notes
Robbie Fields – liner notes

Notes

References

External links
 Beach Blvd. poshboy.com.
 Boehm, Mike (July 19, 1991). "Punks to Revisit Beach Blvd : 3 Suburban Groups Will Play in Huntington to Mark Release of Compilation CD" (page 1/2). latimes.com.

Reviews
 Vodicka, Gabe (August 6, 2009). "1979: Various Artists: Posh Boy - Beach Blvd.". tinymixtapes.com.
 Boehm, Mike (December 31, 1998). "Alt.Rock.OC: 20 Years of Suburban Struggle: Essential Albums, '78-98" (page 2/5). latimes.com.
 Clark, Jenna (February 12, 2014). "Vinyl of the Week - Claude Coma, Beach Blvd. - KCR College Radio". kcr.sdsu.edu.

1979 compilation albums
Punk rock compilation albums